This is a list of current city mayors in Belgium.

List

External link

Belgium

Mayors